A5000 may refer to:

 Yamaha A5000, a sampler
 Power A5000, a planned computer from Power
 Acorn A5000, a computer
 A5000 road (Great Britain)
 Sony α5000, an ILCE camera